Nigloland is an amusement park located in Dolancourt in the French county Aube.
This is one of the most visited parks in France after Disneyland Paris and Parc Astérix.

Nigloland was created by two brothers, Patrice and Philippe Gélis. The park opened June 1, 1987. The name "Nigloland" comes from its mascot, "Niglo", meaning hedgehog in Romani.

The park is divided into four areas: "The Canadian village", "The rock'n'roll village," "The magical village" and "The Swiss village".

Rides 

The park is home to 39 rides, including:
 Le Donjon, a 100 m (328 feet) drop tower, the highest in France (2016)
 Alpina Blitz, the first Megalite type Mega-coaster from Mack Rides (2014)
 Air Meeting, the first Gerstlauer sky-fly ride (2012)
 La Grande Roue, a 50 m high Ferris wheel (2009)
 Le Grizzli, the first European Disk'O Coaster (2006)
 Dinosaures Adventure, an original walk-through ride in a dinosaur park (2003)
 Spatiale Experience, an indoor steel roller coaster, a bit smaller than Eurosat in Europa-Park (1998)

Coasters

Current

Old

Water rides

Thrill rides

L'hôtel des Pirates 
In 2005, Nigloland opened its own hotel, "l'hôtel des pirates," composed of 30 rooms, a restaurant, a theater and a playground.

Notes

References

External links 
 

Amusement parks in France
Aube
Amusement parks opened in 1987
1987 establishments in France